This is a list of recordings released by Scottish electronic music duo Boards of Canada under that name and, rarely, as Hell Interface.

Albums

Studio albums

Live albums
 Peel Session (BBC Radio 1) – 1999 – 12" (Warp, WAP114) and CD (Warp, WAP114CD)
 Live @ Warp10 (Warp 10th Anniversary Party) – 1999
 Live @ ATP (All Tomorrow's Parties at Sussex) – 2001

Limited-only releases
Early in their career, Boards of Canada released several recordings in very limited numbers, distributed only to friends and family. Though their existence, including tracklists, has been confirmed by the band through their website, they have never been made public and have been sought after by fans and collectors.

Unreleased

A few Boards of Canada releases have been acknowledged by the band but never formally released. Three of them are collectively referred to as "Old Tunes".
Random 35 Tracks Tape (1995?)
Old Tunes Vol. 1 (1996)
Old Tunes Vol. 2 (1996)

EPs

Singles

Compilation appearances
The following compilations feature tracks by Boards of Canada.

Soundtrack appearances

Remixes
Boards of Canada have remixed and been remixed by a number of artists.

 "Surfaise (The Trade Winds Mix)" – 1998 – remix of Michael Fakesch on Demon 1
 "Trapped (Hell Interface Remix)" - 1998 - remix of Colonel Abrams on Trapped (as Hell Interface)
 "Dirty Great Mable" – 1998 – remix of Bubbah's Tum on Dirty Great Mable (Remixes)
 "Prime Audio Soup (Vegetarian Soup Remix)" – 1998 – remix of Meat Beat Manifesto on Prime Audio Soup
 "Sandsings" – 1998 – remix of Mira Calix on Pin Skeeling
 "The Midas Touch" – 1999 – remix of Midnight Star on MASK 500 compilation (as Hell Interface)
 "Poppy Seed (Boards of Canada Remix)" and "Poppy Seed (Reprise) (Boards of Canada Remix)" – 2001 – remix of Slag Boom Van Loon on So Soon
 "Last Walk Around Mirror Lake" – 2003 – remix of Boom Bip on From Left to Right
 "Dead Dogs Two" – 2004 – remix of cLOUDDEAD on Dead Dogs Two
 "Broken Drum" – 2005 – remix of Beck on Guero Deluxe Edition
 "Good Friday (Boards of Canada Remix)" – 2007 – remix of Why? on Alopecia
 "Mr Mistake (Boards of Canada Remix)" – 2016 – remix of NEVERMEN on Nevermen
 "Sisters (Boards of Canada Remix)" – 2016 – remix of Odd Nosdam on Sisters
 "Sometimes (Boards of Canada Remix)" – 2017 – remix of The Sexual Objects on Sometimes Remixes
"Treat Em Right (Boards of Canada Remix)" – 2021 – remix of NEVERMEN on Nevermen

Notes

References

Discography
Discographies of British artists
Electronic music group discographies